is a railway line in Osaka Prefecture, Japan, owned by Nankai Electric Railway. This line connects to the Nankai Main Line.

History
The line opened in 1944, electrified at 1500 VDC, to serve the Kawasaki Heavy Industries shipbuilding yard. In 1948 a ferry service connecting to Tokushima on Shikoku via Awaji Island commenced service, and an express service operated from Namba to Tanagawa as part of this service until 1993, the ferry service ceasing in 1998 upon the opening of the Akashi Kaikyo Bridge.

Former connecting lines
 Tanagawa station - A ferry to Sumoto on Awaji Island enabled connection to the Awaji Railway Co. 23km 1067mm gauge line to Fukura, where a ferry service to Naruto operated. The line opened between 1922 and 1925, was electrified at 600 VDC in 1947 and closed in 1966.

Stations

See also
 List of railway lines in Japan

References
This article incorporates material from the corresponding article in the Japanese Wikipedia

Tanagawa Line
Rail transport in Osaka Prefecture
Railway lines opened in 1944